Lillian Schoedler (1891 - 1963) was a diarist and secretary of the New York City Intercollegiate Bureau of Occupations, which eventually became the Bureau of Vocational Information.  Schoedler's diary provides insight into the government agency from the early 20th century, as well as what it was like to be a secretary in that era. She died in August 1963 in a car accident.

Sources

External links
 Lillian Schoedler Papers.Schlesinger Library, Radcliffe Institute, Harvard University.

American diarists
1891 births
1963 deaths
Women diarists
20th-century American women writers
20th-century American non-fiction writers
American women non-fiction writers
20th-century diarists